Lori Wilson (February 15, 1937 – January 30, 2019) was an American lawyer and politician in the state of Florida.

Wilson was born in Waynesville, North Carolina and came to Florida in 1960. She was part Cherokee. She attended Tennessee Tech University, Rollins College and Brevard Community College. Wilson lived in Cocoa Beach, Florida. She was an honorary director of the Central Florida Zoological Society and legislative director of the Florida Injured Wildlife Sanctuary. She was also associated with the University of Florida Foundation. Wilson served on the Brevard County Commission. She served in the Florida State Senate from 1973 to 1978, as an Independent member (16th district).

In her time in public service, Wilson fought to remove all pay toilets in Florida and fought for the passage of a law to protect endangered Florida manatees. Wilson also worked to clean up an unofficial city dump in Cocoa Beach, which was then turned into a city park—named Lori Wilson Park by a unanimous vote.

Wilson went to the Florida State University College of Law and was admitted to the Florida bar in 1984. In 1988, Wilson sought to return to the Florida State Senate, but was narrowly defeated by Democratic state Representative Winston Gardner  

Wilson died at her daughter's Indian Harbour Beach, Florida home on January 30, 2019,  weeks before her 82nd birthday, following a lengthy illness.

References

1937 births
2019 deaths
People from Cocoa Beach, Florida
People from Waynesville, North Carolina
Florida lawyers
Florida State University College of Law alumni
Eastern Florida State College people
Rollins College alumni
Tennessee Technological University alumni
Women state legislators in Florida
Florida Independents
Florida state senators
County commissioners in Florida
20th-century American lawyers
20th-century American women
21st-century American women